Rosalina, known as Rosetta in Japan (ロゼッタ), is a recurring fictional character in the Mario series of video games. She debuted in Super Mario Galaxy (2007), where she acts as a non-player character who resides in the Comet Observatory, the game's hub world. Rosalina is the adoptive mother of the Lumas, a fictional species of stars in the game, and also watcher of the cosmos. Rosalina has since appeared as a player character in subsequent Mario games, such as the Mario Kart, Mario Golf, Mario Party, and the Super Smash Bros. series.

Character development

In an interview, Shigeru Miyamoto stated that he had planned the usual kidnapping of Princess Peach, but also "had another cast of characters, a princess from outer space and her family of talking stars, who had a deeper, sadder story that was revealed through elegant picture-book scenes throughout the game." This storybook was known in-game as Rosalina's Storybook, which told Rosalina's backstory and was written by Yoshiaki Koizumi late at night so that no one would find out about it, saying that "for a long time, it really felt like telling a story in a Mario game was something that wasn't allowed" in an interview. In another interview, Koizumi stated "I felt in this case that the Lumas and Rosalina really needed a story to explain what they were doing out there and to give the players a deeper understanding of their presence. So telling her story as a fairytale by reading the book to all the Lumas as if they were young children at storytime just seemed like the mood-appropriate way to accomplish this."

When Rosalina's character was in early development, the Super Mario Galaxy development team contemplated having her character be related to Princess Peach. This relationship did not remain as an element of the final story, but is the reason for the design similarities between Peach and Rosalina.

Appearances

Super Mario series
In Super Mario Galaxy, Bowser kidnaps Princess Peach by removing her castle from the ground with Peach still inside, and also attacks the Comet Observatory, where Rosalina lives with her adopted Lumas, and steals its main source of fuel: Power Stars. Rosalina asks Mario to retrieve the lost Power Stars; in return she promises to help him save Princess Peach. Once Mario retrieves enough Power Stars, Rosalina is able to turn her Comet Observatory into a comet and drive Mario to the center of the universe, where Bowser keeps the kidnapped Princess Peach. After Bowser is defeated by Mario, Bowser's galaxy at the center of the universe collapses into a supermassive black hole, devouring everything in its path, including Princess Peach's castle, Rosalina's Comet Observatory and Bowser's airships. All of Rosalina's Lumas throw themselves into the black hole in order to stop it. After this, Rosalina appears to Mario, explaining to him about the circle of life and the death and rebirth of stars; it is implicit in her explanation that the universe and all the Lumas are to be reborn. Afterwards, she is gone and Mario, as well as Bowser and Peach, wake up back in the Mushroom Kingdom again. Once 120 Power Stars in the game are collected, Rosalina delivers a thank you message to the player, promising to watch over them from beyond the stars. In a backstory which is unlocked gradually as the game progresses, Rosalina tells the story of how she was a girl who travelled in a spaceship to help a lost Luma find its parents, hiding the fact that she herself had lost her own mother. As Rosalina starts to feel lonely, numerous other Lumas soon come to join her, and she learns that their purpose in life to eventually transform into other things. Rosalina decides to build a house for her new family, which soon becomes the Comet Observatory.

In Super Mario Galaxy 2, throughout the game, a shadowy form named the "Cosmic Spirit", strongly resembling Rosalina, appears to help in levels where the player has died multiple times. Rosalina is the one who mysteriously sends letters containing 50 Star Bits to Baby Luma who grants Mario a spin attack and she herself appears after Mario defeats Bowser and rescues Princess Peach in the final cutscene before the credits play. Rosalina also appears late in the game as well (by collecting 120 Power Stars), telling Lumas the story of the "Green Stars", which opens the Green Star missions (additional optional missions in the game), and finally, with the game completed, she appears on the game's hub and thanks Mario.

In Super Mario 3D World, Rosalina is featured as an unlockable fifth character. She possesses the ability to perform the Spin Attack that Mario could in the Galaxy games, using it as both an attack and a second jump. When asked why Nintendo chose Rosalina over other Mario characters, director Kenta Motokura responded, "I was thinking about what would be pleasing after the ending and wanted to bring in another female character in addition to Princess Peach. Rosalina has a following among the Super Mario Galaxy fanbase, and she's appeared in Mario Kart recently, so I think she is well known."

In Super Mario Odyssey, she has a minor reference as hint art in the Dark and Darker side of the moon which can be hit by Cappy to collect ten coins.

Other games
Rosalina appears in Mario Kart Wii, Mario Kart 7, Mario Kart 8, Mario Kart Arcade GP DX and Mario Kart Tour as an unlockable character, and is available by default in Mario Kart 8 Deluxe. Mario Kart 8 sees the introduction of a baby version of Rosalina.<ref>Official Game Bio: "Making her debut on the track, Rosalina shows her experience of space travel translates well to rocketing round the race course. With a friendly Luma by her side, Rosalina is right at home on the track!". Nintendo.</ref> Rosalina also has a namesake racing track in Mario Kart 7 called Rosalina's Ice World. Joystiq commented on her appearance, saying that it was nice to see that another "Nintendo character join the obscenely large roster of folks showing their faces in the game."

 
She also appears as a playable character in Mario Golf: World Tour, available via downloadable content. Rosalina is a playable fighter in Super Smash Bros. for Nintendo 3DS and Wii U and Super Smash Bros. Ultimate, where she fights alongside various colored Lumas, as well as being in Mario Party 10, Mario Tennis: Ultra Smash, Super Mario Party, Mario Tennis Aces, Mario Golf: Super Rush and Mario Party Superstars. She also joined the roster in Mario & Sonic at the Rio 2016 Olympic Games, and later reappeared in Mario & Sonic at the Olympic Games Tokyo 2020. Rosalina appears in Super Mario Maker as a Mystery Mushroom costume, which can be unlocked either through the 100-Mario challenge, or by scanning her amiibo figure. Rosalina also appeared in a crossover in Puzzle & Dragons Z. She appears in Mario + Rabbids Sparks of Hope along with a Rabbid version of her.

Reception

In a poll conducted by Official Nintendo Magazine, the readers ranked Rosalina as the sixth greatest female character. Journalist Tom East who conducted the poll described Rosalina as a "leading lady", saying that "she obviously made a big impression on you because after one appearance (not counting Mario Kart) she has made the top ten."

Chris Greenhough of Joystiq claimed that Super Mario Galaxy was the first Mario game to have an engaging story, and cited Rosalina as an example, saying that "although this narrative thread (Rosalina's Storybook) starts life as the kind of standard fare you'd expect from a Mario title, Rosalina's tale quickly becomes tragic". Game researcher and designer Douglas Wilson opined in GameSetWatch that Super Mario Galaxy's most surprising moment did not involve new gaming mechanics, a plot twist, but rather the character Rosalina and her storybook, stating "The biggest shocker was a simple storybook tale told by a princess named Rosalina." Furthermore, he wrote that "Super Mario Galaxy is a brilliant game, for reasons already covered in various reviews. Yet despite the largely positive coverage, I was disappointed that the gaming press so overwhelmingly ignored (or in one case, dismissed) Rosalina’s storybook", and compared it to The Little Prince and My Neighbour Totoro. Siliconera called Rosalina's Storybook "bittersweet" as "the game could just as easily been a simple "save the princess" story and still have been a great game, but...the engaging story takes Super Mario Galaxy to an artistic level other Mario titles haven't approached."

Destructoid reviewed Rosalina very positively, saying that she is a "celestial stunner", summing up that "Rosalina embodies style perfection" and thus is "out of this world", giving her an "A+" on their Gamer's Red Carpet. Kotaku's Michael McWhertor called her an "attractive Peach replacement" in their Super Mario Galaxy impressions. Phil Pirrello of IGN reviewed Rosalina positively, giving her a 7 out of 10. Shane Bettenhausen of 1UP.com labelled Rosalina as a "celestial hottie", and one of the better Mario Kart Wii characters in an otherwise disappointing roster. Larry Hester of Complex listed Rosalina as one of the 40 "hot but forgotten" female video game characters.

Rosalina also drew some criticisms. Callum Archer of GameRant.com listed Rosalina at number nine in his top-ten list of Mario characters that disappeared from the franchise or should disappear, describing her as a re-skin of Princess Peach, who "didn't even do that much" in Super Mario Galaxy 2. Jake Shapiro of NintendoLife complained about Rosalina being a princess from the Mario franchise, stating "It’s a bummer that every single female-identified character in Mario Kart 8 is a princess". Matthew Wilkinson of TheGamer.com listed Rosalina among the five characters that should not return in the Mario Kart series, stating that "Now feels like the right time to take her out of this franchise for a while". Joey Davidson of TechnoBuffalo.com disapproves the addition of Baby Rosalina in Mario Kart 8, stating she "could have been dropped for better options". Jeremy Parish of Polygon.com ranked 73 fighters from Super Smash Bros. Ultimate "from garbage to glorious", listing Rosalina at 51st, stating that "Rosalina is basically the most powerful singular force in the cosmos, if Super Mario Galaxy is to be believed—a divine arbiter of existence who can reset all reality at will. You’d think she’d have better things to do than whallop on Bowser Jr." Gavin Jasper of Den of Geek ranked Rosalina as 33rd on his list of Super Smash Bros. Ultimate'' characters, stating "Rosalina is a fresh addition to the Mario franchise and a welcome face at his parties and go-kart races. In Smash, she adapts the Ice Climbers concept as her own fighting style, thanks to her partnership with Luma." According to John Adams of his "Female Fighters: Perceptions of Femininity in the Super Smash Bros. Community", that Rosalina had non-sexualized focus on her appearance, prompting users on praising on its costumes.

References
  Text was copied from Rosalina at Super Mario Wiki, which is released under a Creative Commons Attribution-Share Alike 3.0 (Unported) (CC-BY-SA 3.0) license.

External links
Rosalina on Super Mario Wiki

Extraterrestrial characters in video games
Female characters in video games
Mario (franchise) characters
Nintendo protagonists
Super Smash Bros. fighters
Video game characters introduced in 2007
Video game characters who use magic
Video game sidekicks
Princess characters in video games